Jordan Jackson may refer to:

 Jordan Jackson (soccer) (born 1990), American soccer player
 Jordan Jackson (American football) (born 1998), American football player
 Jordan Jackson-Hope (born 1996), Australian rugby union player